Monica Fiafialoto (born 1 March 1965 at Wallis) is a former French athlete, who specialised in the Javelin.  She is the mother of  rugby player Yann David.

Biography  
She won two French national javelin titles in 1983 and 1985. She notably made a record throw of 57.10m.

Prizes Won  
 French Championships in Athletics   :  
 2-time winner in the javelin throw in 1983 and 1985.

Records

References

External links  
  Docathlé2003, French Athletics Federation, 2003 p. 403

1965 births
Living people
French female javelin throwers